Sector 55-56 is a station of the Rapid Metro Gurgaon in Haryana, India which is owned by Haryana Mass Rapid Transport Corporation Limited (HMRTC) and operated by Delhi Metro Rail Corporation (DMRC). Earlier it was operated by Rapid Metro Gurgaon Limited (RMGL). The station was opened to the public on 31 March 2017.

References

External links
 
 

Rapid Metro Gurgaon stations
Railway stations in Gurgaon district